The Last Days: the Apocryphon of Joe Panther is a 1998 Ned Kelly Award-winning novel by the Australian author Andrew Masterson.

Awards

Ned Kelly Awards for Crime Writing, Best First Novel Award, 1999: winner

Reviews
 "Australian Crime Fiction database" 
 "Tabula Rasa" 

Australian crime novels
1998 Australian novels
Ned Kelly Award-winning works